Local elections were held in the province of Quezon on May 13, 2013 as part of the 2013 general election.  Voters will select candidates for all local positions: a town mayor, vice mayor and town councilors, as well as members of the Sangguniang Panlalawigan, the vice-governor, governor and representatives for the four districts of Quezon.

Background
Incumbent David Suarez is running for a second term as governor of Quezon under the National Unity Party. Suarez assumed the governorship after defeating Rafael Nantes in the 2010 elections. His running mate is 2nd district board member Romano Franco Talaga.

Irvin Alcala, incumbent representative of the 2nd district of Quezon and son of incumbent Agriculture Secretary Proceso Alcala is running under the Liberal Party. Alcala was elected representative in 2010, as replacement of his father who did not run and was later appointed as Agriculture Secretary. His running mate is Samuel Nantes, son of former governor Rafael Nantes who became governor in 2007 until his death on May 17, 2010.

Opinion Polling

Gubernatorial election

Provincial elections
The candidates for governor and vice governor with the highest number of votes wins the seat; they are voted separately, therefore, they may be of different parties when elected.

Gubernatorial election
Parties are as stated in their certificate of candidacies.

David Suarez is the incumbent.

Vice-gubernatorial election
Parties are as stated in their certificate of candidacies.

Incumbent Vicente Alcala is running for congressman

Congressional elections

1st District
Wilfredo Mark Enverga is the incumbent.

2nd District
Incumbent Irvin Alcala is running for the governorship; his uncle, Vice Governor Vicente Alcala, is his party's nominee.

3rd District
Incumbent Danilo Suarez is term limited; his wife, former congresswoman Aleta Suarez, is his party's nominee.

4th District
Incumbent Lorenzo Tañada III is term limited; his brother Wigberto Jr. is his party's nominee.

Provincial Board Elections

1st District

2nd District

3rd District

4th District

City and municipal elections
Source:

1st District, Candidates for Mayor
City: Tayabas City
Municipalities: Burdeos, General Nakar, Infanta, Jomalig, Lucban, Mauban, Pagbilao, Panukulan, Patnanungan, Polillo, Real, Sampaloc

Tayabas City
Dondi Silang is the incumbent.

Burdeos
Gil Establecida is the incumbent, his opponent is councilor Freddie Aman.

General Nakar
Obing Ruzol is the incumbent, his opponent is former mayor Hernando Avellaneda, Sr.

Infanta
Incumbent mayor Grace America is term-limited and running for vice mayor instead, her party nominate councilor Rodante Potes. his main opponent is vice mayor Ricardo Macasaet III.

Jomalig
Rodel Tena is the incumbent, his opponents are vice mayor Ruben Belda and Alex Enverga.

Lucban
Incumbent mayor Moises Villasenor is term-limited, his party nominate his son Marvin Loui Villasenor.

Mauban
Fernando Llamas is the incumbent.

Pagbilao
Incumbent Romeo Portes is not running; his daughter, councilor Shierre Ann Portes-Palicpic, is running for her position under NUP

Panukulan
Duhe Postor is the incumbent.

Patnanungan
Danteo Eusebio is the incumbent, his opponents are councilor Ellen Malarasta and Saling Abrazando.

Polillo
George Versoza is the incumbent.

Real
Incumbent Joel Amando Diestro is running for his reelection independent.

Sampaloc
Naning Torres is the incumbent.

2nd District, Candidates for Mayor 
City: Lucena City
Municipalities: Candelaria, Dolores, San Antonio, Sariaya, Tiaong

Lucena City

Candelaria

Dolores

San Antonio

Sariaya

Tiaong

3rd District, Candidates for Mayor
Municipalities: Agdangan, Buenavista, Catanauan, General Luna, Macalelon, Mulanay, Padre Burgos, Pitogo, San Andres, San Francisco, San Narciso, Unisan

Agdangan

Buenavista

Catanauan

General Luna

Macalelon

Mulanay

Padre Burgos

Pitogo

San Andres

San Francisco

San Narciso

Unisan

4th District, Candidates for Mayor
Municipalities: Alabat, Atimonan, Calauag, Guinayangan, Gumaca, Lopez, Perez, Plaridel, Quezon, Tagkawayan

Alabat

Atimonan
Mayor Jose F. Mendoza for his last term.

Calauag

Guinayangan

Gumaca

Lopez

Perez

Plaridel

Quezon

Tagkawayan

References

2013 Philippine local elections
Elections in Quezon
Politics of Quezon
2013 elections in Calabarzon